Harbour Main-Chapel's Cove-Lakeview is a town on the Avalon Peninsula in Newfoundland and Labrador, Canada. It is in Division 1, on Conception Bay. During King William's War, the village was destroyed in the Avalon Peninsula Campaign.

Demographics 

See also
 List of cities and towns in Newfoundland and Labrador

References

Populated coastal places in Canada
Towns in Newfoundland and Labrador